Maynard Ferguson's Hollywood Party is an album released by Canadian jazz trumpeter Maynard Ferguson featuring tracks recorded in early 1954 and originally released on the EmArcy label as a 10-inch LP but reissued as a 12-inch album. The album was released on CD compiled with Jam Session featuring Maynard Ferguson as Hollywood Jam Sessions in 2005.

Reception

Allmusic awarded the album 3 stars but rated Hollywood Jam Sessions 4½ stars stating "Hollywood Jam Sessions has some of Ferguson's most exciting performances from his Los Angeles years".

Track listing
 "Night Letter" (Maynard Ferguson) - 14:08   
 "Somebody Loves Me" (George Gershwin, Ballard MacDonald, Buddy DeSylva) - 15:44

Personnel 
Maynard Ferguson - trumpet, valve trombone
Bud Shank - alto saxophone, flute
Bob Cooper - tenor saxophone
Bob Gordon - baritone saxophone
Russ Freeman - piano
Curtis Counce - bass  
Shelly Manne - drums

References 

1955 albums
Maynard Ferguson albums
EmArcy Records albums